Klyuchi is a rural locality (a selo) in Ivolginsky District, Republic of Buryatia, Russia. The population was 103 as of 2010. There are 2 streets.

Geography 
Klyuchi is located 10 km southwest of Ivolginsk (the district's administrative centre) by road. Ivolginsk is the nearest rural locality.

References 

Rural localities in Ivolginsky District